Bagu may refer to:
 Bagu language, an Australian language
 Baghu (disambiguation), several places in Iran
 Baghuiyeh (disambiguation), several places in Iran
 Sergio Bagú (1911–2002), Argentinian historian

See also 
 Bagoo (disambiguation)